The Henlopen Conference is a high school sports conference comprising public schools in Kent County and Sussex County in lower Delaware. The teams participate in a variety of sports including football, boys and girls soccer, track and field, cross country, boys and girls basketball, boys and girls indoor track, boys and girls outdoor track, wrestling, boys and girls lacrosse, baseball, softball, cheerleading, boys and girls swimming, and field hockey.

Schools and teams 

The schools and teams that make up the Henlopen Conference are divided into two divisions, the Henlopen Northern Division and Henlopen Southern Division. Despite the name, the schools are not divided by geographical location, but rather by enrollment numbers, with the larger schools in the Northern Division and the smaller schools in the Southern Division. The conferences are re-arranged every few years based on enrollment numbers.

The current conference alignment for the schools along with the city they are located in are:

Henlopen Northern Division

Henlopen Southern Division

Membership timeline

Conference history 

The Henlopen Conference was created in the January 1959 as a conference of Sussex County schools with enrollments under 350. The conference began its first interleague conference play with the start of the 1959 high school baseball season.  The initial members of the Henlopen Conference were the Bridgeville Mustangs, Rehoboth Beach Seahawks, Milton Warriors, Greenwood Foresters, Delmar Wildcats, Millsboro Blue Devils, John M. Clayton Bears, Lord Baltimore Lords, and Selbyville Rebels. While an initial member of the newly formed conference, the Delmar Wildcats did not join the conference for interleague conference play until the beginning of the 1959–60 basketball season. Two weeks later, on February 3, 1959, the Harrington Lions and Felton Green Devils were admitted, expanding the league into Kent County. The Dover Air Force Base Falcons joined two years after its formation.

In 1969, additional teams were added as the Diamond State Conference, originally formed by the larger schools of Kent and Sussex County, merged with the Henlopen Conference.  These were: Smyrna, Dover, Caesar Rodney, Milford, Seaford, Lewes,  Georgetown and Middletown; Middletown being the lone member from New Castle County. Lewes and Georgetown were the first schools that decided to migrate from the Diamond State Conference and join and eventually every team from the Diamond State Conference (except for Middletown) joined the Henlopen Conference. Middletown, as the only New Castle County school, moved to a conference composed entirely of New Castle County schools after one year of playing as an independent because they were barred from joining the Henlopen Conference due to the conference by-laws regarding geography.

Because of the state mandated school district mergers of 1969–70, the teams changed their geographical makeup. Lewes, Milton, and Rehoboth Beach merged to form the Cape Henlopen Vikings. Georgetown, John M. Clayton, and a large part of the Millsboro School District merged to become the Sussex Central Golden Knights (the other portion of Millsboro was absorbed into Cape Henlopen). Greenwood and Bridgeville merged to become the Woodbridge Blue Raiders. Harrington and Felton merged with Frederica to become the Lake Forest Spartans. Lord Baltimore and Selbyville were merged with Frankford and Dagsboro to become the Indian River Indians. The Milford School District also joined the conference after merging with the Ellendale and Houston school districts, keeping the Milford Buccaneers name. Magnolia and Oak Point merged with Caesar Rodney in 1969 and Dover Air Force Base high school students were absorbed into the Caesar Rodney High School after the United States government closed down the base's school in the 1980s. The Polytech Panthers (1992) and Sussex Tech Ravens (1995) joined the conference with the addition of their sports teams when the schools made the transition from vocational trade schools to technical and academic schools. In August 2015, the Sussex Academy of Arts and Sciences became the newest school, and first charter school, to join the Henlopen Conference.

Of note is that not all teams joined the conference immediately at its inception, affecting the number of conference championships the teams could have won.

Football

Football history

Since 1969, teams in the Henlopen Conference have won a total of 25 state football championships.  The south leads the north in championships 16 to 9.  Caesar Rodney leads the northern division with three Division I Championships and Delmar leads the southern division with six Division II Championships.  Woodbridge High School was the last team to win a state championship in 2016.

Only three times has the conference swept the Division I and Division II championship.  In 1988, Dover from the North and Indian River from the South were the first to do it.  In 2008, Caesar Rodney from the North and Milford from the south accomplished the feat. In the 2008 championship games, both Caesar Rodney and Milford defeated Sussex Central and Laurel to win their respective championships, marking the only time the final four teams in the state tournament were from the Henlopen Conference. In the latest occasion, Woodbridge won the Division II championship and Smyrna won the Division I championship in 2016.

Seaford High School is the only school in the conference to win both a Division I and II Championship.

2006 Lake Forest forfeits

In 2006 Lake Forest High School had to temporarily shut down their varsity football team due to allegations of use of painkillers. Lake Forest forfeited their final eight games for that season.

Milford controversy

Prior to the 2007–08 school year, Milford was moved to the Henlopen South while Smyrna joined the Northern Division due to changes in enrollment. On September 30, 2008, those numbers were rechecked and confirmed to determine the assignments for the 2009–10 and 2010-11 school years. With only a total of 8 students separating the seventh and eighth largest schools, with Polytech coming in a 1,164 and Milford at 1,156; the conference assignments were certified to stay the same through June 2011. This included Polytech in the North Division and Milford in the South.

Days prior to the Division 2 Championship game, Polytech High School challenged the enrollment numbers that were submitted by Milford High School. Polytech brought their case to the athletic directors of the Henlopen Conference schools in a monthly meeting, and Milford argued their case as to why the numbers were correct. At the center of Polytech's argument were 17 students of the Intensive Learning Center, a separate school from Milford High School for special needs and mentally challenged students that rented space inside Milford High. The Polytech officials argued that those students were in the building and should be counted, the Milford officials argued that it was a separate school and that the State of Delaware did not count those children in Milford's enrollment nor did Milford receive funding for them.

A vote was held by the athletic directors of the various schools in the conference, all of the directors in the South voted Milford should move up to the North except Laurel High School; all of the directors in the North said Milford should stay down except for Polytech High School, which made it a 6–6 vote as Milford was not allowed to vote. However, the director for Sussex Central wasn't present for the meeting, so the director for Indian River High School was allowed to vote twice as Indian River High School and Sussex Central High School are in the same school district. The director voted two times that Milford move to the North Division and the vote was confirmed.
In December 2008, Milford appealed to the superintendents of the schools comprising the Henlopen Conference. The superintendents voted to uphold the decision of the athletic directors as it was an athletics issue. Milford also appealed to the Delaware Interscholastic Athletic Association, the governing body for athletics in Delaware schools. The DIAA decided that the matter needed to be handled by the Henlopen Conference and that they would not be involved.
On April 15, 2009, Milford High School filed a lawsuit against the Henlopen Conference in Chancery Court challenging that the vote was against the conference by-laws. In the lawsuit, Milford is listed as seeking "declaratory relief" and to have the vote to change the conference alignments nullified, placing Milford High School back in the South Division. On July 2, that lawsuit was dismissed.

Historical Henlopen Conference football records

1950s

1959 Regular Season Football Standings

Henlopen Conference

1960s

1960 Regular Season Football Standings

Henlopen Conference

1961 Regular Season Football Standings

Henlopen Conference

1962 Regular Season Football Standings

Henlopen Conference

1963 Regular Season Football Standings

Henlopen Conference

1964 Regular Season Football Standings

Henlopen Conference

1965 Regular Season Football Standings

Henlopen Conference

1970s

1980s

1990s

2000s

2002 Regular Season Football Standings

Henlopen Northern Division

Henlopen Southern Division

2003 Regular Season Football Standings

Henlopen Northern Division

Henlopen Southern Division

2004 Regular Season Football Standings

Henlopen Northern Division

Henlopen Southern Division

Delaware high school playoffs were expanded from a four team field in both Division I and Division II to six team field for both divisions beginning with the 2004 season.

2005 Regular Season Football Standings

Henlopen Northern Division

Henlopen Southern Division

2006 Regular Season Football Standings

Henlopen Northern Division

Henlopen Southern Division

2007 Regular Season Football Standings

Henlopen Northern Division

Henlopen Southern Division

2008 Regular Season Football Standings

Henlopen Northern Division

Henlopen Southern Division

The week one meeting between Milford and St. Marks (Wilmington, Delaware) was ranked the #10 matchup in the nation by MaxPreps.

2009 Regular Season Football Standings

Henlopen Northern Division

Henlopen Southern Division

2010s

2010 Regular Season Football Standings

Henlopen Northern Division

Henlopen Southern Division

2011 Regular Season Football Standings
Henlopen Northern Division

Henlopen Southern Division

2012 Regular Season Football Standings
Henlopen Northern Division

Henlopen Southern Division

2013 Regular Season Football Standings
Henlopen Northern Division

Henlopen Southern Division

2014 Regular Season Football Standings
Henlopen Northern Division

Henlopen Southern Division

2015 Regular Season Football Standings
Henlopen Northern Division

Henlopen Southern Division

Henlopen Conference Football Championships (By Year) 

Of note: Teams with a gold background went on to win the State Championship.

(*** Dover Air Force High School shut down operations and merged with Caesar Rodney High School.  The two schools have always been in the same school district.)

Prior to 1969 there were no North and South divisions, simply an overall champion. They were:

Note that of those pre-1969 teams listed above, only Indian River and Delmar still exist as school districts today, with Indian River's merger coming prior to the 1969–70 school year.

Total Henlopen Conference Football Championships

Football rivalries 

Battle of the Bell Milford vs. Lake Forest – Started in 1969 when the conferences were formed and school districts were consolidated. The winning team keeps the trophy, the bell off a train that used to run between Milford and Harrington, for a year until the next Battle of the Bell.

2013 Battle of the Bell Champion – Lake Forest (33-7)

Delaware's Oldest High School Rivalry Seaford vs. Laurel – The oldest rivalry game in the state, and said to be the third oldest rivalry in the nation, these two towns are separated by only 6 miles and a large turn-out is always expected.

2013 Delaware's Oldest High School Rivalry Champion – Laurel (46-6)

The Civil War Caesar Rodney vs. Dover – A cross-town rivalry game in Dover.

2013 Civil War Champion – Caesar Rodney (42-18)

The Battle for Georgetown Sussex Tech vs. Sussex Central – A cross-town rivalry game in Georgetown.

2013 Battle for Georgetown Champion – Sussex Tech (28-27)

The Tech Bowl Sussex Tech vs. Polytech – A rivalry game between Sussex County and Kent County's two technical high schools.

2013 Tech Bowl Champion – Sussex Tech (35-28)

The Harvest Bowl Smyrna vs. Middletown – A non-conference rivalry game going back to before the Henlopen Conference when the two teams played in the Diamond State Conference.

2012 Harvest Bowl Champion – Middletown (47-19)
 Did not play in 2013

Battle for the Lions Club Trophy Delmar vs. Laurel – The two towns are only 9 miles apart along U.S. 13 and the winner takes home a trophy sponsored by the local Lions Club.

2013 Battle for the Lions Club Trophy Champion – Delmar (21-20)

Intra-district Rivalry Sussex Central vs. Indian River – A rivalry game between the two schools that belong to the Indian River School District.  The IRSD is one of the largest districts in the state of Delaware.

2013 Intra-district Rivalry Champion – Sussex Central (29-27)

Wrestling championships 

Prior to 1969 there were no conferences, simply a Tournament Champion. In 1970 the school districts consolidated. Of those pre-1969 teams, only Indian River and Delmar still exist as school districts today, with Indian River's merger coming prior to 1969–70.

Total Division Championships:
Caesar Rodney – 21 (most all time in the North)
Cape Henlopen – 1
Delmar – 0
Dover – 7
Indian River – 2 
Lake Forest – 0
Laurel – 2 
Milford – 6 *Only team to win championships in both the North & South (2 in North, 4 in South)
Polytech – 0
Seaford – 0 
Smyrna – 29 (Most by any school, in any conference, in any sport in the state)
Sussex Central – 7
Sussex Tech – 0
Woodbridge – 0

Conference Dual Meet Championships (Overall Champion):
Caesar Rodney – 16 (most all time)
Cape Henlopen – 0
Delmar – 0
Dover – 4
Indian River – 0 
Lake Forest – 0
Laurel – 0
Milford – 2 *One of only 2 Sussex County schools to win overall championship
Polytech – 0
Seaford – 0 
Smyrna – 12
Sussex Central – 5 *One of only 2 Sussex County schools to win overall championship
Sussex Tech – 0
Woodbridge – 0

Tournament Championships:
Caesar Rodney – 10 (most all time)
Cape Henlopen – 0
Delmar – 2
Dover – 7
Indian River – 0 
Lake Forest – 2 *Both won by Harrington prior to 1970 merger
Laurel – 0
Milford – 0
Polytech – 0
Seaford – 0 
Smyrna – 4
Sussex Central – 4
Sussex Tech – 0
Woodbridge – 0

Boys basketball championships 

Prior to 1970 the conference was broken down into East and West based on geographic location. An Eastern Division and Western Division Champion was declared and a championship game was played between the two to determine the Henlopen Conference Champion. No division champions were declared in 1960 and 1961, instead the team with the best record was named Henlopen Conference Champion.

Note that of those pre-1969 teams listed above, none still exist as an independent school district.

Total division championships: 
Caesar Rodney – 3 *Includes 1 won by Dover Air Force Base
Cape Henlopen – 21 *Includes 2 won by Rehoboth (does not included 1960 & 1961) and 5 won by Milton (Most in the North Division and all time)
Delmar – 0 
Dover – 4
Indian River – 19 *Includes 1 won by Lord Baltimore (Most in the South Division)
Lake Forest – 10 *Includes 2 won by Felton
Laurel – 0
Milford – 3
Polytech – 2
Seaford – 4 (3 in North, 1 in South)
Smyrna – 6 (3 in North, 3 in South)
Sussex Central – 3
Sussex Tech – 3
Woodbridge – 7 *Includes 2 won by Bridgeville and 1 won by Greenwood

Total Henlopen Conference Championships:
Caesar Rodney – 3 *Includes 1 won by Dover Air Force Base
Cape Henlopen – 15 *Includes 3 won by Rehoboth and 3 won by Milton
Delmar – 0 
Dover – 4
Indian River – 6
Lake Forest – 4 *Includes 2 won by Felton
Laurel – 0
Milford – 2
Polytech – 0
Seaford – 3
Smyrna – 3
Sussex Central – 1
Sussex Tech – 3
Woodbridge – 2 *Includes 1 won by Bridgeville

Baseball championships

Boys State Championships 

The following Henlopen Conference boys teams have gone on to win state championships (includes pre-merger teams). Of note, if (I/II) appears in the division category, all divisions play for the only state championship.

Baseball

Basketball

Cross Country

Football

The Unified Division was added in 2016 and is a DIAA recognized athletic division partnering students with and without disabilities in conjunction with Special Olympics Delaware.

Golf

Indoor Track

Lacrosse

Outdoor Track

 The Middletown Cavaliers won the first outdoor track championship in 1942 as a member of the Diamond State Conference, a precursor to the Henlopen Conference which Middletown is not a part of as they are in New Castle County.
 1977 was the only year for a Division 1 & 2 North and Division 1 & 2 South for outdoor track.
 The Unified Division was added in 2015 and is a DIAA recognized athletic division partnering students with and without disabilities in conjunction with Special Olympics Delaware.

Soccer

 2013 was the first year that soccer was split into two state championships.

Tennis

Wrestling

 1993 was the first year Wrestling was split into two state championships.

Total Boys State Championships

 Dover Air Force Base High School shut down operations in the mid-1980s and students were absorbed into Caesar Rodney .

Girls State Championships 

The following Henlopen Conference girl teams have gone on to win state championships (includes pre-merger teams). Of note, if (I/II) appears in the division category, all divisions play for the only state championship. There were no girls championships until the 1973–1974 school year, all championships are post-merger.

Basketball

 Cape Henlopen won the first girls basketball championship in 1973.

Cross Country

Field Hockey

 2017 was the first year of a split between Division 1 and Division 2, with separate state championships

Indoor Track

Lacrosse

 Cape Henlopen's win for lacrosse in 2009 was the first time a public high school had won the girls lacrosse state championship ever in Delaware, which started in 1998.

Outdoor Track

 Dover won the first outdoor track championship in 1973.
 1977 was the only year for a Division 1 North and Division 1 South outdoor track championship.

Tennis

Softball

 Milford won the first softball championship in 1976.

Total Girls State Championships

Overall state championships 

The total number of state championships won by Henlopen Conference teams in both boys and girls sports, in order of championships won:

Cape Henlopen Vikings – 54
Caesar Rodney Riders – 48
Dover Senators – 37
Lake Forest Spartans – 22
Milford Buccaneers – 21
Seaford Blue Jays – 16
Smyrna Eagles – 15
Sussex Central Golden Knights – 10
Delmar Wildcats – 7
Indian River Indians – 7
Woodbridge Blue Raiders – 6
Laurel Bulldogs – 5
Sussex Tech Ravens – 5
Polytech Panthers – 3
Dover Air Force Base (defunct) – 1

Notable sports alumni 

Walter "Huck" Betts of Millsboro was a pitcher for the Philadelphia Phillies and Boston Braves in the 1920s and 1930s, in the pre-draft years.
Caleb "Tex" Warrington of Dover (Dover Senators) played center and guard for the Brooklyn Dodgers football team of the All-America Football Conference (the precursor to today's American Football Conference in the National Football League) from 1946 to 1948 out of Auburn University.
Carl Elliott of Laurel (Laurel Bulldogs) played defensive end and wide receiver for the Green Bay Packers from 1951 to 1954 out of the University of Virginia.
Forest "Spook" Jacobs of Milford  was a second baseman for the Philadelphia Athletics, Kansas City Athletics, and Pittsburgh Pirates from 1954 to 1956, is one of only two players in Major League Baseball history to go 4 for 4 in his first major league game (the other being Delino DeShields of Seaford, Delaware), and is a 1991 inductee to the Delaware Sports Museum and Hall of Fame.
Chris Short of Milford (Milford Buccaneers) was a pitcher for the Philadelphia Phillies and Milwaukee Brewers from 1959 to 1973, beginning in the pre-draft years.
Carl Ergenzinger of Dover (Dover Senators) was drafted as a catcher and third baseman in the ninth round for the Houston Astros in 1965, the first year of the formal Major League Baseball Draft.
Danny LeBright of Milford (Milford Buccaneers) was a pitcher for the Houston Astros, making the team in a 1967 tryout.
Thomas Sullivan of Dover (Dover Senators) was drafted as a pitcher in the eleventh round by the Cleveland Indians in 1969.
Randy Lee of Laurel (Laurel Bulldogs) was drafted as a pitcher in the 15th round by the Baltimore Orioles in 1970.
Renie Martin of Dover (Dover Senators) was drafted as pitcher in the 9th round by the San Francisco Giants in 1976 out of the University of Richmond.
Ralph Jean of Dover (Dover Senators) was a pitcher drafted by the Oakland Athletics in the 33rd round of the 1978 draft.
Randy Bush of Dover (Dover Senators) was drafted as an outfielder by the Minnesota Twins in the 2nd round in 1979 out of the University of New Orleans.
Robert Nichols of Delmar (Delmar Wildcats) was drafted as a pitcher by the Pittsburgh Pirates in the 14th round of the 1980 draft.
Julie Dayton of Laurel (Laurel Bulldogs) was first team All-American in lacrosse in 1980 and 1981 out of Longwood College, was a ten-year member of Team USA from 1980 to 1990, was the head field hockey coach for University of Virginia and Dartmouth College, and is a 2003 inductee into the Delaware Sports Museum and Hall of Fame.
Oliver Maull of Lewes (Cape Henlopen Vikings) was drafted as a catcher by the Baltimore Orioles in the 26th round of the 1981 draft.
Mike Meade of Dover (Dover Senators) played fullback for the Green Bay Packers and Detroit Lions from 1982 to 1985 out of Pennsylvania State University.
Bob Vantrease of Seaford (Seaford Blue Jays) was drafted as a pitcher by the Oakland Athletics in the 29th round of the 1983 draft out of the University of Delaware.
Doug Willey of Bridgeville (Woodbridge Blue Raiders) was drafted as a pitcher by the Atlanta Braves in the 15th round of the 1985 draft out of Essex Community College.
Warren McGee of Seaford (Seaford Blue Jays) was signed by the Philadelphia Phillies as a pitcher after the 1986 draft.
Delino DeShields of Seaford (Seaford Blue Jays) was drafted as a second baseman by the Montreal Expos as the 12th overall pick in the 1st round in 1987 out of Villanova University and is one of only two players in Major League Baseball history to collect four hits in their major league debut (the other was Milford's Spook Jacobs), had career totals of 1548 hits, 872 runs scored, 561 RBIs, and 463 stolen bases. He was named the Baltimore Orioles Most Valuable Player in 2000 and is a 2006 inductee into the Delaware Sports Museum and Hall of Fame.
Clarence Bailey of Milford (Milford Buccaneers) played as a fullback for the Miami Dolphins in 1987 out of Hampton University.
Pat Wright of Camden (Caesar Rodney Riders) was drafted as a catcher by the Oakland Athletics in the 32nd round of the 1988 draft.
Michael Neill of Seaford (Seaford Blue Jays) was drafted as an outfielder by the Oakland Athletics in the 2nd round of the 1991 draft out of Villanova University, won an Olympic gold medal with the United States Olympic Baseball team, won 5 state championships in Little League, advanced three times to the Little League World Series, 1991 Big East Player of the Year, and is a 2005 inductee to the Delaware Sports Museum and Hall of Fame.
Stoney Briggs of Seaford (Seaford Blue Jays) was drafted as an outfielder by the Toronto Blue Jays in the 8th round of the 1991 draft out of Delaware Technical & Community College.
Mark Harris of Camden (Caesar Rodney Riders) was drafted as a shortstop by the Chicago White Sox in the 17th round of the 1991 draft.
Ben Cephas of Seaford (Seaford Blue Jays) was drafted as an outfielder by the Milwaukee Brewers in the 27th round of the 1992 draft out of Delaware Technical & Community College.
Frank Roberts of Seaford (Seaford Blue Jays) was drafted as a pitcher by the Florida Marlins in their inaugural draft in 1993 in the 72nd round (the draft was extended for the expansion teams).
Brad Lee of Lewes (Cape Henlopen Vikings) was drafted as an outfielder by the Texas Rangers in the supplemental draft in 1994 out of Delaware Technical & Community College.
Brian Miflin of Lewes (Cape Henlopen Vikings) was drafted as an outfielder by the New York Mets in the 50th round of the 1994 draft out of Delaware Technical & Community College.
Mike Riley of Seaford (Seaford Blue Jays) was drafted as a pitcher by the San Francisco Giants in the 16th round of the 1996 draft out of West Virginia University.
Lovett Purnell of Seaford (Seaford Blue Jays) was drafted as a tight end and wide receiver by the New England Patriots in the 7th round of the 1996 draft and played for the Baltimore Ravens as well, was drafted by the Chicago White Sox, was captain of the West Virginia University football team and named to the WVU All-Century Team, named All-Big East, and played in Super Bowl XXXI, and was a 2007 inductee into the Delaware Sports Museum Hall of Fame.
Erik McLaughlin (Polytech Panthers) was signed by the Atlanta Braves after a try-out in 1996.
Rob Meyers of Felton (Lake Forest Spartans) was signed by the Minnesota Twins after a try-out in 1997.
Dave Williams of Camden (Caesar Rodney Riders) was drafted as a pitcher by the Pittsburgh Pirates in 1998.
Luke Petitgout of Georgetown (Sussex Central Golden Knights) was drafted as an offensive lineman by the New York Giants as the 19th overall pick of the 1999 draft out of the University of Notre Dame.
Ian Snell (aka Ian Oquendo) of Dover (Caesar Rodney Riders) was drafted as a pitcher by the Pittsburgh Pirates in the 26th round in the 2000 draft.
Mark Comoli of Millsboro (Indian River Indians) was drafted as a pitcher by the Toronto Blue Jays in the 25th round of the 2001 draft out of Delaware Technical & Community College.
Isiah Wright of Dover (Dover Senators) was drafted as a pitcher by the Montreal Expos in the 15th round of the 2002 draft.
Shawn Phillips of Laurel (Laurel Bulldogs) was drafted as a pitcher by Texas Rangers in the 2004 draft out of Delaware State University.
Derrick Gibson of Seaford (Seaford Blue Jays) was drafted as a shortstop and pitcher by the Boston Red Sox in the 2nd round of the 2008 draft.
Theodis Bowe of Ellendale (Milford Buccaneers) was drafted as a center fielder by the Cincinnati Reds in the 21st round of the 2008 draft.
 Jerell Allen of Milford (Milford Buccaneers) was drafted as a center fielder by the Kansas City Royals in the 11th round of the 2011 MLB draft.
 Devon Reed of Milford (Milford Buccaneers) was drafted as a shortstop by the Florida Marlins in the 20th round of the 2011 MLB draft.
Nicholas Grant of Milford (Milford Buccaneers) was drafted as a pitcher by the New York Mets in the 15th round of the 2012 MLB draft.
Professional wrestlers Jamin and Mark Pugh, The Briscoe Brothers, of Laurel (Laurel Bulldogs) received honorable mention all-state for football in both their junior and senior years of high school.
 Carrie Lingo of Rehoboth Beach (Cape Henlopen Vikings) played field hockey for University of North Carolina Tar Heels where she was a two-time All-ACC honoree, won a National Championship in 1997, was a national runner-up in 2000, and was named to the ACC 50th Anniversary Team as one of the top field hockey players in conference history. After college, she represented the United States in the Pan American Cup, Pan American Games, World Cup, Olympic qualifier and the Beijing Olympics. She was elected to the Delaware Sports Hall of Fame in 2015.

References

Education in Sussex County, Delaware
Education in Kent County, Delaware
Delaware high school sports conferences